Mithridates II Antiochus Epiphanes Philorhomaeus Philhellen Monocrites (died 20 BC), also known as Mithridates II of Commagene, was a king of Commagene in the 1st century BC.

Of Iranian and Greek descent, he was one of the sons of King Antiochus I Theos of Commagene.

Biography 
According to Plutarch, Mithridates was an ally of the Roman triumvir Mark Antony. In 31 BC, Mithridates personally led his forces to Actium in Greece in support of Antony in the war against Caesar Octavian, the future Roman emperor Augustus. After the defeat of Antony, however, Mithridates became a loyal ally to Augustus. Nevertheless, Augustus forced Mithridates to hand over a village in Commagene called Zeugma, which was a major crossing point of the Euphrates River, to the Roman province of Syria. To show his support for Augustus, Mithridates dropped the title Philhellen ("friend of the Greeks") from his Aulic titulature and adopted the title Philorhomaeus ("friend of the Romans") instead. Both titles were derived from the Commagenean royal cult that Mithridates' father had founded, and in which Mithridates played an important role. His other title Monocrites is an otherwise unattested title and was most likely a judicial function within the royal administration and a sign of his high social standing.

Mithridates had a brother, Antiochus II of Commagene, who was also a prince of the kingdom. In 29 BC, Antiochus was summoned to Rome and executed by Roman emperor Augustus, because Antiochus had caused the assassination of an ambassador whom Mithridates had sent to Rome.

References

Sources
 
 
 
 
 
 
 

Kings of Commagene
20 BC deaths
1st-century BC rulers in Asia
Year of birth unknown